Papparousi is a small village in Evrytania, Greece. It is part of the municipality of Karpenisi. The name Papparousi came from a priest that lived there and his last name was Roussos. There are two parts of the village: Dytiko Papparousi, and Papparousi. The population of the village is 34 (2011 census).

References

Populated places in Evrytania